Molly Giles (born in 1942) is an American short story writer, novelist, and professor at the University of Arkansas. She formerly taught at San Francisco State University. She is the author of Creek Walk and Other Stories published in 1997 and the novel Iron Shoes published in 2000.  Her story collection Rough Translations won the Flannery O'Connor Award for Short Fiction. In 2020, her short story collection Wife With Knife won the Leapfrog Press Global Fiction Prize Contest and in 2022, the short story from that collection, "Bad Dog" won a Pushcart Prize.  She also appears in Sudden Fiction (Continued) (60 New Short-Short Stories). Her short stories have been translated into Spanish.

Awards
 Flannery O'Connor Award for Short Fiction
 Leapfrog Global Fiction Prize 2020
 Pushcart Prize 2022

References

External links
 Official website
Interview with Molly Giles
the University of Arkansas

1942 births
Living people
American women writers
Flannery O'Connor Award for Short Fiction winners
21st-century American women